The 2016 Guam Republican presidential caucuses took place on March 12 in the U.S. territory of Guam as one of the Republican Party's primaries ahead of the 2016 presidential election.

On the same day, the Republican Party held their Washington, D.C. caucus, while the Democratic Party held a caucus in the Northern Mariana Islands. The Democratic Party's own Guam caucus was held on May 7, 2016.

Results

Gov. Eddie Calvo, one of the delegates from Guam, had announced his support for Cruz prior to the March 12 Guam caucus.  But, the slate of delegates all committed to Trump after both Cruz and Kasich dropped out.

Delegates 
 Governor Eddie Calvo
 Territorial Senator Frank Blas, Jr.
 Territorial Senator Tony Ada
 Juan Carlos Benitez
 Benny Pinaula
 Former Territorial Senator Telo Taitague
 Mike Benito (Republican Party Chairman) (automatically a delegate)
 David Sablan (National Committeeman) (automatically a delegate)
 Margaret Metcalfe (National Committeewoman) (automatically a delegate)

See also 
 2016 United States presidential straw poll in Guam
 2016 United States presidential election
 2016 Guam Democratic presidential caucuses

References

External links 
 RNC 2016 Republican Nominating Process 
 Green papers for 2016 primaries, caucuses, and conventions

Guam
2016 Guam elections
2016